Piers Gerald Mackesy  (15 September 1924 – 30 June 2014) was a British military historian who taught at the University of Oxford.

Early life and education
Piers Mackesy was born in Cults, near Aberdeen in Scotland, the son of Major-General Pierse Joseph Mackesy and Leonora Cook. Growing up in an army family, he followed his father's assignments and lived on a number of army posts, including Quetta, Chatham, and Borden. Mackesy was educated at Wellington College and was commissioned into the Royal Scots Greys in 1944, serving until 1947. Subsequently, he became a scholar of Christ Church, Oxford, obtaining his bachelor's degree in 1950. As a graduate student, Mackesy studied for his D.Phil. degree at Oriel College, Oxford, where he wrote his thesis on British Strategy in the Mediterranean, 1803–1810.

Mackesy's daughter is the novelist Serena Mackesy.

Academic career
Upon completion of his doctorate, Mackesy was appointed Harkness Fellow at Harvard University, and in the following year he was appointed tutor in modern history and Fellow of Pembroke College, Oxford in 1954, remaining there until he retired in 1988. While at Pembroke, he became senior tutor and vicegerent of the College. For many years, he taught the special subject in military history at Oxford with Professor N. H. Gibbs. This course of study involved using the War of the Second Coalition as a case study for examining the theories of Carl von Clausewitz. He was an Emeritus Fellow of Pembroke College from 1988 until his death in 2014.

Mackesy was visiting fellow, Institute for Advanced Study in Princeton (1961–62), visiting professor, California Institute of Technology (1966), Bland-Lee Lecturer at Clark University, the Naval War College, the U.S. Military Academy, and Northeastern University. He was the Lees Knowles Lecturer at Cambridge University in 1972, and served as a member of Council, Institute of Early American History and Culture, Williamsburg, Virginia, 1970–73.

In 1978 the University of Oxford awarded Mackesy the degree of DLitt. In 1988 he was elected a Fellow of the British Academy.

Publications
 The War in the Mediterranean, 1803–1810 (1957)
 The War for America, 1775–1783 (1964, 1992) 
 Statesmen at War: the Strategy of Overthrow, 1798–1799 (1974)
 Could the British have Won the War of Independence?: Bland-Lee lecture, September 1975 (1976)
 The Coward of Minden: the Affair of Lord George Sackville (1979) 
 War without Victory: The Downfall of Pitt, 1799–1802 (1984)
 British Victory in Egypt, 1801: the End of Napoleon's Conquest (1995) — awarded the Templer Medal

Contributor to:

 Michael Howard, ed, Wellingtonian Studies (1959)
 David L. Jacobson, ed., Essays on the American Revolution (1970)
 William M. Fowler, Jr. and Wallace Coyle, eds., The American Revolution: Changing Perspectives (1979)
 John B. Hattendorf and Malcolm H. Murfett, eds, The Limitations of Military Power: Essays Presented to Professor Norman Gibbs on His Eightieth Birthday (1990)

Sources
"Fellows in the 1940s and 1950s" — Pembroke College, Oxford
"Liberty Scholars"
"The Templer Medal Book Competition"
 British Academy Memoir of Piers Mackesy by Michael Duffy

References

1924 births
2014 deaths
Military personnel from Aberdeen
Alumni of Christ Church, Oxford
Alumni of Oriel College, Oxford
British Army personnel of World War II
British historians
British military historians
British military writers
Fellows of Pembroke College, Oxford
Fellows of the British Academy
Harkness Fellows
Harvard Fellows
Historians of the American Revolution
People from Aberdeen
Royal Scots Greys officers